Kristiyan Peshov (born 16 June 1997) is a Bulgarian footballer who plays as a midfielder for Septemvri Sofia.

Career
Peshov joined CSKA Sofia's youth team set up aged 9, and captained the Under-19 side, but left the club after his last game for CSKA's academy. 

In June 2016, Peshov signed first professional contract with Second League side Sozopol.

In June 2018, Peshov signed with Slavia Sofia as a free agent.

References

External links

1997 births
Living people
Bulgarian footballers
FC Sozopol players
PFC Slavia Sofia players
FC CSKA 1948 Sofia players
FC Septemvri Sofia players
First Professional Football League (Bulgaria) players
Association football midfielders
Footballers from Sofia